Old Orchard Beach is a resort town and census-designated place (CDP) in York County, Maine, United States. The population was 8,960 at the 2020 census. It is part of the Portland−South Portland−Biddeford, Maine Metropolitan Statistical Area.

Located on the inner side of Saco Bay on the Atlantic Ocean, the town is a popular seaside resort. The downtown contains many tourist-oriented businesses, including clam shacks and T-shirt shops. A wooden pier on the beach contains many other tourist businesses, including a variety of souvenir shops. The seven mile (11 km) long beach actually covers three different towns (Scarborough, Old Orchard Beach, and Saco, north to south), and is lined with many beach residential properties, condominiums, motels and bed and breakfasts.

Early history
The first European visitor to the area around the mouth of the Saco and Goosefare rivers was  British explorer Martin Pring in 1603. Members of the Abenaki tribe inhabited pockets of the area before Pring's first visit to the region.

The Old Orchard Beach area began appearing in historical records around 1653. The area was first officially settled in 1657 by Thomas Rogers who had arrived in the Goosefare Brook area in 1636,<ref name="VARNEY">Varney, George J., [http://history.rays-place.com/me/old-orchard-beach-me.htm Historical Sketch of Old Orchard Beach, Maine From A Gazetteer of the State of Maine"], B. B. Russell, 57 Cornhill, Boston 1886</ref> and who dubbed it "The Garden By The Sea". The town takes its name from Rogers' abandoned apple orchard. Rogers' family left the area and relocated in Kittery, Maine after an Indian attack destroyed the Rogers' homestead. The namesake orchard survived for approximately 150 years as a beacon of land to sailors in the Atlantic Ocean. The historic Free Will Baptist revival camp at Ocean Park, Maine, just down the beach from central Old Orchard, was built in 1881 by Bates College President Oren B. Cheney. The mission of the Association, as declared to the State of Maine on January 24, 1881 was "to establish a place of summer resort for holding religious, educational and other meetings at Old Orchard, in Saco, Maine, in the County of York.". The community still thrives today.

Tourist resort

In 1829 the first Public House opened. In 1837 tourists were paying a small amount to stay at a local farm while they visited the area. In 1942, trains could be taken from Boston to Portland. Over the years Old Orchard developed into a major resort. At one point, planes were able to take off from the beach, as well as, some automobiles racing on the sand. Most of the large hotels were destroyed in the fire of 1907.  The oldest hotel still standing on the beachfront in Old Orchard at this time is The Ocean House Hotel & Motel, circa 1895, located at 71 West Grand Avenue.  It retains its original parlors and character. In 1923, when discrimination in lodging was rampant and Black musicians were denied rooms in other local hotels, the Cummings' Guest House opened at 110 Portland Avenue to offer lodging to Black visitors. It was operated by Rose and Edward Cummings Jr. and prominent guests included Duke Ellington, Cab Calloway, Count Basie, and Lionel Hampton. The guest house operated until 1993.

Attractions
The seaside amusement park Palace Playland is located in Old Orchard Beach. The amusement park dates back to 1902 and sits on four acres of beachfront property. Palace Playland is one of the last old-timey oceanside amusement parks in New England.

Old Orchard Beach was home to the first carousel in the United States, and in the past there were two carousels with hand-carved horses and other animals. Noah's Ark, a kid-friendly, boat-shaped funhouse with hand-carved figures of Noah and his family, was designed to provide an exciting but not frightening experience for a 5-year-old. The entire structure would rock back and forth while guests meandered through dark passages. Colored lights would flash, loud klaxons would sound, and compressed air would shoot from the floor.

The current 2019 version of Palace Playland consists of a newly built Ferris wheel, a  arcade, and 25 rides for both children and adults.

Every Thursday the beach has a firework show at the pier at night.  This occurs in the summer from Memorial Day until Labor Day.

The Pier

Three versions of the Pier were constructed by people and modified by nature. When the ribbon was cut on July 2, 1898, it was a “global cultural icon,” at 1,825 feet the longest steel pier in the world, created by Berlin Iron Bridge Co. at a cost of $38,000. At its end was the Pier Casino, a ballroom with room for 5,000 dancers. In the interwar period, the Casino hosted such acts as Guy Lombardo, Louis Armstrong, Benny Goodman, Xavier Cugat and Frank Sinatra. After the war Old Orchard became somewhat downscale, becoming known as a destination for blue-collar partygoers. A fire in 1969 destroyed Noah's Ark, the two carousels, the Whale's Mouth, the Mine Ride, and the Jack and Jill slide. The Casino was demolished in 1970.
The current incarnation of the pier was built in 1980 after being destroyed by a blizzard in 1978. The current structure stretches  into the Atlantic Ocean. The wooden walk way is lined with souvenir shops, carnival-style foods, and a night club at the end of the pier.

Sports

Old Orchard Beach was home to the Old Orchard Beach Surge, a baseball team which played in the independent Empire Professional Baseball League. They played at The Ballpark which was opened in 1984 as the first home to the AAA Maine Guides and renovated in 2009.

From 2012-2014, the Old Orchard Beach Raging Tide in the New England Collegiate Baseball League played at the ballpark. in 2014 Owners John & Pam Gallo sold the Raging Tide franchise, which became the Bristol Blues .

The Old Orchard Beach Surge relocated to Saranac Lake, NY in 2019 and continue to play in the Empire Professional Baseball League as the Saranac Lake Surge.

Geography and transportation

Old Orchard Beach is located on the Southern Maine Coast. It is bounded by Saco Bay to the east,  Scarborough to the northeast, and Saco on all other sides.

During summer months, Amtrak's Downeaster train stops at Old Orchard Beach station with service to the Portland Transportation Center and Boston's North Station.

Twin cities
Old Orchard Beach is the twin city of the French seaside resort of Mimizan, as a reminder of Oiseau Canari, the pioneer aircraft crossing of the Atlantic by Assollant, Lefèvre and Lotti in 1929 to Oyambre (Cantabria, Spain).

Immigration and foreign affairs
Old Orchard Beach, during the high tourist season, sees an influx of Lithuanian, Latvian, Turkish, Serbian, Bulgarian and Russian foreign exchange students looking for summer work. Many French Canadians, especially from the province of Quebec, come for summer vacations, and it is common to hear conversations in French.

Demographics

2010 census

As of the census of 2010, there were 8,624 people, 4,454 households, and 2,106 families residing in the town. The racial makeup of the town was 98.2% White, 0.0% African American, 0.8% Native American, 0.9% Asian, 0.1% from other races, and 0.0% from two or more races. Hispanic or Latino of any race were 1.7% of the population.

There were 4,454 households, of which 17.2% had children under the age of 18 living with them, 34.6% were married couples living together, 8.9% had a female householder with no husband present, 3.8% had a male householder with no wife present, and 52.7% were non-families. 41.6% of all households were made up of individuals, and 13.4% had someone living alone who was 65 years of age or older. The average household size was 1.93 and the average family size was 2.61.

The median age in the town was 47.8 years. 14.3% of residents were under the age of 18; 6.9% were between the ages of 18 and 24; 24.1% were from 25 to 44; 35.7% were from 45 to 64; and 18.9% were 65 years of age or older. The gender makeup of the town was 47.9% male and 52.1% female.

Old Orchard Beach is in House District 13 and represented in Augusta by Lori Gramlich.

 In popular culture 
 The Magnetic Fields have a song entitled "Old Orchard Beach" on their 1992 album The Wayward Bus.
 Maine author Josh Pahigian has a mystery novel entitled "Strangers on the Beach" set in Old Orchard Beach.
 Part of Stephen King's novel Thinner is set at Old Orchard Beach
 The Archers Beach series by Sharon Lee (writer) has a setting inspired by Old Orchard Beach and Palace Playland.
 The town (including the pier) is represented in the map of the 2014 open world racing video game The Crew'' and its 2018 sequel.

Notable people

 Laura Creavalle, Guyanese-born Canadian/American professional bodybuilder
 David Lemoine, state legislator
 Leatrice Morin, state legislator (1973–1976)
 Jerome Plante, state legislator and town manager
 Charles Scontras, labor historian

See also

 The Ballpark
 Cummings' Guest House

References

External links

 Town of Old Orchard Beach
 Epodunk Town Profile
  Vintage Images of Old Orchard Beach

 
Beaches of Maine
Census-designated places in Maine
Portland metropolitan area, Maine
Towns in York County, Maine
Towns in Maine
Populated coastal places in Maine
Landforms of York County, Maine
Resort towns